Pachora is the Municipal council in district of Jalgaon, Maharashtra.

History
The Pachora municipal council established on 1 April 1947.

Municipal Council election

Electoral performance 2016

References 

Municipal councils in Maharashtra